Sancha of Portugal (1180 in Coimbra – 13 March 1229 in Celas Monastery), was a Portuguese infanta, second daughter of King Sancho I of Portugal and Dulce of Aragon.

Life
She was born 1180 and was the feudal Lady of Alenquer.

Sancha and her sisters Teresa and Malfada were very wealthy, having inherited large estates after  the death of their father in 1211. In 1212, their brother Ferdinand married Joan, Countess of Flanders and was imprisoned by the French after Battle of Bouvines in 1214.

Their brother, King Afonso II of Portugal contested ownership of his sisters' castles of Seia, Alenquer and Montemor-o-Novo and their right to use the title of queen. Afonso wanted to centralize power and feared that this could create a problem of sovereignty that could come to divide the country. Much of the Portuguese nobles sided with the princesses, but they were defeated. The king's brother Peter, had also sided with his sisters and was banished. On the death of Afonso II, his son Sancho II granted some lands and castles to his aunts but he made them renounce the title of princess-queen. The final peace came in 1223.

In 1219, she welcomed the Franciscan Berard of Carbio and his companions to Alenquer. Upon hearing that they planned to go to Morocco to preach the Gospel, she provided them with laymen's clothes so they could pass through Seville, which remained under Muslem rule.

A significant portion of her wealth she spent on acquiring property to establish and support her monastery. Sancha founded the Monastery Santa Maria de Celas, near Coibra, around January 1223. Part of the work of the nuns at Celas was the care of the sick. It later affiliated with the Cistercian order.

Sancha died at the Monastery Santa Maria de Celas. Her body was moved to Lorvão Abbey by her sister Theresa of Portugal.
 
On 13 December 1705 she was beatified by Pope Clement XI's papal bull Sollicitudo Pastoralis Offici, along with her sister Theresa of Portugal. Her feast day and that of her two sisters Teresa and Mafalda is 20 June.

Ancestry

References

Bibliography 
 
 
 

1170s births
1229 deaths
House of Burgundy-Portugal
Portuguese infantas
French beatified people
Portuguese Roman Catholics
Roman Catholic royal saints
12th-century Portuguese people
13th-century Portuguese people
12th-century Portuguese women
13th-century Portuguese women
13th-century venerated Christians
Beatifications by Pope Clement XI
Daughters of kings